During the 2002–03 Spanish football season, Real Valladolid competed in the La Liga.

Season summary
Valladolid finished the season in 14th position in the La Liga table. In other competitions, Valladolid reached the fourth round of the Copa del Rey.

David Aganzo was the top scorer for Valladolid with 9 goals in all competitions.

Kit
Valladolid's kit was manufactured by British sports retailer Umbro and sponsored by Agroinnova.

Squad

Goalkeepers 
  Albano Benjamín Bizzarri
  Jon Ander
  Julio Iglesias

Defenders 
  Gaspar
  Alberto Marcos Rey
  Mario
  Javier Muñoz Mustafá
  Óscar Sánchez
  Juan Manuel Peña
  José Luis Santamaría
  Javier Torrez Gómez

Midfielders 
  Abel
  Agustín
  Antonio López Álvarez
  José Luis Caminero
  Chema
  Dragan Ćirić
  Gonzalo Colsa
  Fernando Sales
  Javi Jimenez
  Javier Moré
  Jésus
  Jorge Manrique
  Pablo Richetti

Attackers 
  David Aganzo
  Jonathan
  Nicolás Olivera
  Óscar González
  Pachon
  Francisco David Sousa

Real Valladolid seasons
Valladolid